Asikuma-Odoben-Brakwa is one of the constituencies represented in the Parliament of Ghana. It elects one Member of Parliament (MP) by the first past the post system of election. The Asikuma-Odoben-Brakwa constituency is located in the Asikuma-Odoben-Brakwa district of the Central Region of Ghana.

Boundaries
The seat is located entirely within the district of the same name in the Central Region of Ghana.

Members of Parliament

See also
List of Ghana Parliament constituencies
Agona District

References 

Parliamentary constituencies in the Central Region (Ghana)